The Italian ambassador to South Korea is the diplomatic representative of the Italian government to the government of South Korea.

The list of ambassadors from Italy to South Korea began long after diplomatic relations were established in 1884. The current official title of this diplomat is "Ambassador of the Republic of Italy to the Republic of Korea."

Italian-Korean diplomatic relations were initially established during the Joseon period of Korean history.

After the Italy-Korea Treaty of 1884 was negotiated, ministers from Italy could have been appointed in accordance with this treaty.  However, diplomatic affairs were initially handled by the Italian representative in Shanghai.

List of heads of mission

Ambassadors
-: Francesco Rausi
-2010: Massimo Andrea Leggeri
: Sergio Mercuri
: Marco della Seta (* born  in Milan)
 : Federico Failla

See also
 Italy-Korea Treaty of 1884
 List of diplomatic missions in South Korea

Notes

References
 Halleck, Henry Wager. (1861).  International law: or, Rules regulating the intercourse of states in peace and war 	New York: D. Van Nostrand. OCLC 852699
 Korean Mission to the Conference on the Limitation of Armament, Washington, D.C., 1921-1922. (1922). Korea's Appeal to the Conference on Limitation of Armament. Washington: U.S. Government Printing Office. OCLC 12923609

South Korea
List
Italy